Lóránd Fráter (1872-1930) was a Hungarian composer of Nóta despite not being of the Romani people. He was also a politician. He was a major songwriter of the early 20th century.

References 

Hungarian composers
Hungarian male composers
Members of the National Assembly of Hungary
1872 births
1930 deaths